Teviothead is a small village and civil parish in Teviotdale in the Scottish Borders, known locally as Teviotheid. It is located south of the River Teviot.

The Border hero Johnnie Armstrong and his men were taken prisoner and executed here in 1530, by King James V. A fine memorial stone exists in the churchyard, and a marker in the adjacent field shows the traditional site of the grave.
Tom Jenkins, Britain's first black schoolmaster taught at the Smithy, now occupied by the Johnnie Armstrong Gallery, from 1814 to 1818.

The poet Henry Scott Riddell died in Teviotdale and Scottish motorcycle road racer Steve Hislop died in a helicopter crash on nearby hillside moorland in the Teviot valley in 2003.

See also
List of places in the Scottish Borders
List of places in Scotland

Villages in the Scottish Borders
Parishes in Roxburghshire